"Junkie" is a song performed by Danish pop, dance and R&B singer and songwriter Medina, featuring Svenstrup & Vendelboe. It was released on 20 August 2013 as a digital download in Denmark. The song was released as the fifth single from her second English-language album Forever. The song peaked at number 18 on the Danish Singles Chart.

Track listing

Chart performance

Weekly charts

Release history

References

2013 singles
2013 songs
EMI Records singles
Songs written by Engelina